Sina Alam (born 18 December 1989, in Tehran, Iran) is a musician, composer and an Iranian Kamancheh, Ghichak and Violin player. He began his artistic career in music as a child with a violin. As a teenager he attended high school at a music conservatory playing Kamancheh as his main instrument. He continued his music education under the supervision of various professors.

Music career 
The names of his masters are: Mostafa kamal pourtorab, Mohsen Nafar, Hadi Arazm, Hadi Montazeri, Mohammad Reza Azadehfar, Vartan Sahakian, and Esmaeel Gerami. He has completed his bachelor's degree in music with a focus on Kamancheh Instrument at the University of Tehran. He is the main member of Shooh ensemble under the direction of Hooman Khalatbari. He has also been active in Shahram Nazeri and Ali Zand Vakili ensembles. While studying at university, he always participated in various concerts. He also collaborated with the IRIB as a musician and composer, and has experience in teaching at a music conservatory. Sina Alam received a music teaching license from the Ministry of Culture and Islamic Guidance in 2008. Another of his experiences is participating in various concerts as a fiddle player. Such as concerts of Professor Shahram Nazeri and the Simorgh Orchestra that has been composed and sung by Professor Homayoun Shajaran. He is currently working for the Ali Zand Vakili Group. In 2011, as a musician and composer, he participated in the instrumental album "Cut pieces". In addition, he produced other singles in which he performed both as a musician and as a composer. Main ideator and member of Shoosh ensemble under the direction of Hooman Khalatbari, who started his activity in 2022 Sina Alam and Zand.

Awards 

 Won a silver medal in the 2020 Global Music Awards competition for Kamaneh ro Album

Albums

Single tracks

Book 
Kamanche navazi novin (two parts).

Tabnak news site 
On 6 January 2016, Sina Alam with Ali Zand Vakili Live in Concert in Isfahan He performed some new Tracks from his new Album "Yadi Be Range Emrouz" with his Band on 1 January. Kamancheh, Kamancheh Alto & Violin player: Sina Alam, Tar & Setar player: Sahab Alam, Tombak & Cachon: Afshin Babaie, Percussion: Shayan Riyahi, Bass Guitar: ramtin Atabaki, Guitar, Electric Guitar & Piano player: Omid Ghafaria

External links

References 

Living people
Iranian violinists
1989 births
Iranian composers